Nicoletia is a genus of silverfish in the family Nicoletiidae. Most of the ~30 species originally placed in this genus have subsequently been moved into other genera, primarily Coletinia and Anelpistina, so there are only 9 species presently in the genus.

Species
 Nicoletia anophthalma (Bilimek, 1867)
 Nicoletia armata Silvestri, 1901
 Nicoletia cavicola Joseph, 1882
 Nicoletia emersoni Folsom, 1923
 Nicoletia geophila Gervais, 1844
 Nicoletia maggii Grassi & Rovelli, 1880
 Nicoletia neotropicalis Silvestri, 1901
 Nicoletia phytophila Gervais, 1844
 Nicoletia tergata Mills, 1940

References

Further reading

 

insect genera